Oil sludge or black sludge is a gel-like or semi-solid deposit inside an internal combustion engine, that can create a catastrophic buildup. It is often the result of contaminated engine oil and occurs when moisture and/or high heat is introduced to engine oil.

Causes
Oil sludge may occur due to a variety of different factors. Some of the most common causes are:
 Defective crankcase ventilation system 
 Oil/coolant contamination
 Neglecting oil changes
 Low oil level
 Poor engine design

Precautions
Oil sludge is generally preventable through frequent oil changes at manufacturer specified intervals, however, while uncommon, some engines do have a tendency to build up more sludge than others.

References

External links 
 burn oil sludge utilization
 Installation for saving of heavy fuel on boilers,utilization of condensate water and heavy residuals of fuel in tankfarm waste oil residues and oiled condensate water in ports and tank farms
 sludge - dispersion and utilisation as fuel

Engines
Motor vehicle maintenance